Hiroshi Ikehata (池畑 大, born ) is a Japanese male weightlifter, competing in the 62 kg category and representing Japan at international competitions. He participated at the 1996 Summer Olympics in the 59 kg event and at the 2000 Summer Olympics in the 62 kg event. He competed at world championships, most recently at the 1999 World Weightlifting Championships.

Major results

References

External links
 

1970 births
Living people
Japanese male weightlifters
Weightlifters at the 1996 Summer Olympics
Olympic weightlifters of Japan
Place of birth missing (living people)
Weightlifters at the 1994 Asian Games
Weightlifters at the 1998 Asian Games
Weightlifters at the 2000 Summer Olympics
Asian Games bronze medalists for Japan
Asian Games medalists in weightlifting
People from Kagoshima Prefecture
Medalists at the 1994 Asian Games
Medalists at the 1998 Asian Games
20th-century Japanese people
21st-century Japanese people